Maquela Airport  is an airport serving Maquela do Zombo, a city in Uíge Province, Angola.

During the Angolan War of Independence, the present airport served as the Portuguese Air Force's Maneuver Aerodrome 31, a satellite military airfield of the Base-Aerodrome 3 at Negage.

See also

 List of airports in Angola
 Transport in Angola

References

External links 
OpenStreetMap - Maquela
OurAirports - Maquela
Maquela Airport

Maquela